Givi Dmitriyevich Chokheli (27 June 1937 in Telavi – 25 February 1994 in Tbilisi) was a Georgian football defender.

Chokheli played most of his career for Dinamo Tbilisi. After ending his playing career he worked in various coaching positions for Dinamo Tbilisi and in 1969-1970 and 1974 was a head coach.  He was classified as a Master of Sport of the USSR in 1959.

He played for Soviet Union national team (19 matches), and was a participant at the 1962 FIFA World Cup and at the 1960 UEFA European Football Championship, where the Soviet Union won the gold medal.  The Soviet back line was anchored by the famous trio of Chokheli, Anatoli Maslyonkin, and Anatoly Krutikov in the early 1960s.

Telavi's Municipal Stadium features a statue of Chokheli in front of it.

References

External links
 Imedi: On the 70th Birthday of Chokheli  
 RussiaTeam biography 

1937 births
1994 deaths
Footballers from Georgia (country)
Soviet footballers
Football managers from Georgia (country)
FC Dinamo Tbilisi managers
Soviet football managers
1962 FIFA World Cup players
1960 European Nations' Cup players
UEFA European Championship-winning players
Soviet Union international footballers
Honoured Masters of Sport of the USSR
Soviet Top League players
FC Dinamo Tbilisi players
People from Telavi
Association football defenders